King Arthur's Disasters is a British animated series which first aired on CITV. Co-created by Paul Parkes and Will Ashurst, the series follows and depicts attempts by King Arthur, assisted by the wizard Merlin, to woo the beautiful self-obsessed Princess Guinevere. Due to the popularity of the show, it was picked up for a second series which began transmission on CITV from 6 November 2005. Both were executive-produced by Genevieve Dexter at cake entertainment

King Arthur's Disasters was the highest-rated new CITV show during spring 2005. It regularly achieved an audience share of over 20% of children and it regularly won its time slot against CBBC. In 2006 the show was nominated for a children's BAFTA for Best Animation; however, it lost to The Amazing Adrenalini Brothers. It airs on Pop in the UK.

Story
Princess Guinevere requests a certain object, animal, or being which she apparently desperately wants or truly has need of. Arthur accepts, in return for her agreed hand in marriage. Arthur, usually accompanied by Merlin, will set off on a quest which sometimes included other people to gain the item required. He is beset by numerous dangers before finally reaching his goal, however something will always ruin it or its effects and Guinevere will never be pleased, or if she is, soon after she will be displeased. The enemies to the king are his two rebellious knights, Sir Lancelot and Sir Martyn, who constantly quarrel between each other but share the king as a common enemy.

Characters
The show uses a stock series of characters drawn from the popular reception of the Arthurian Legend, and whose most notable features demonstrate the influences of 20th century, rather than medieval incarnations of the knights. The main recurring characters are:
 Arthur (Rik Mayall), the eponymous king whose disasters provide the main plot motivation.
 Guinevere (Morwenna Banks), the archetypal bored princess whom her creators describe as "the Paris Hilton of her generation". While having no intentions of actually marrying Arthur she uses her hold over him to will him into finding her the things she desires; water from the fountain of youth, a winter palace, a golden bear, and so on. In the later episodes, however, she really starts to love Arthur. Guinevere is so self-absorbed, sometimes she doesn't even notice Arthur's absence.
 Merlin (Matt Lucas), Arthur's only faithful servant, whose bumbling manner might hide a devious, brilliant mind... or might not.
 Lancelot (Phil Cornwell), Arthur's first knight, who resembles nothing so much as a fusion of James Bond and Terry-Thomas. Holding a grudge since a childhood dispute, Lancelot seeks any occasion to rid himself of Arthur and usurp the vacant throne; a trope which leads him to heartily encourage Arthur's more perilous quests, and recalls Steve Barron's Merlin (film) TV series, transferring the adultery theme to a more 'child-friendly' comic equivalent.
 Lady 'M(Margret), is King Arthur's cunning older sister. She has claimed to live in France. (in the episode Glass Rose, King Arthur stayed at her castle in France) Unknown to Arthur, her brother she is also the famous Sir Margret who is liked by townsfolk. She does things for the benefit of the townsfolk as seen in Glass Rose. She has come to Arthur and Guinevere's rescues a couple of times in a few episodes as Sir Margret. She made her first appearance in the episode Glass Rose.
 Robin Hood (Phil Cornwell), a cheery denizen of the forest who (along with his not so merry men) serves as an antagonist to Arthur since an encounter with the Singing Oak Tree and the ruse of a cunning pig... While technically speaking, the character is an anachronism (depending on which Arthurian source a viewer prefers), the inclusion of Robin Hood is not without precedent in Arthurian films, since Nathan Juran's Siege of the Saxons included a Robin-esque character, and the backdating of Robin places him within broadly the same time period as Chrétien de Troyes, who was writing his Arthurian legends (late 12th Century). His voice was based on Tony Blackburn.
 Sir Martyn, a deliberately anachronistic (or perhaps anatopistic) insertion into the legend, perhaps an homage to Akira Kurosawa whose Seven Samurai present a similarity with occidental medieval knights.
 Splag, Arthur's only loyal knight, who is a stocky brute capable of only monosyllabic grunts.
 Alan, Arthur's horse.

Episodes

Series 1 (2005)

Series 2 (2005)

International broadcasts

References

External links
 King Arthur's Disasters home page
 

2000s British children's television series
2005 British television series debuts
2006 British television series endings
Television series based on Arthurian legend
British children's animated adventure television series
British children's animated comedy television series
British flash animated television series
Disney Channel original programming
2000s British animated television series